Machairodontini is an extinct tribe of large saber-toothed cats of the subfamily Machairodontinae, that lived in Europe, Asia, Africa, and North America, during the Middle and Late Miocene.

Description
Machairodont means "knife-tooth" which perfectly describes the species that make up Machairodontini. These predators are related to extant cats, the Felinae, and share a common ancestor within the Felidae clade. This clade is also occasionally classified as being part of the Homotherini, and includes genera such as Machairodus, Hemimachairodus and Miomachairodus. They were first characterized by their scimitar canines in the upper jaw. This means that the canines are shorter and coarsely serrated, with vertical flattening. Although the upper canines are shorter than other more famous saber toothed cats such Smilodon, they are still abnormally long in comparison to the rest of the teeth in the mandible. There is also a space separating the canines and premolars known as a diastema. The bottom portion of the jaw contains small incisors that are in a straight row with a large, lower canine. These canines are not nearly as big as the upper canines. There is a diastema between the canines and the premolars in the lower jaw as well.

These prehistoric predators not only have long upper canine teeth but they also have elongated limb bones, which differ from the squatter legs of the other group of saber-toothed cats, the Smilodontini. Although not many complete skeletons of machairodontine species have been found, those specimens known illustrate the long limb bones and shorter tails. The tails are of medium length and do not reach the ground as they do with cats today.

Taxonomy
Machairodontini was named by Gill (1872) as well as de Beaumont (1964). It was assigned to Machairodontinae by Berta and Galiano (1983).

Classification

Phylogeny
The phylogenetic relationships of Machairodontini are shown in the following cladogram:

Geologic and geographic distribution
The earliest machairodontine is the genus Miomachairodus from the late middle Miocene in Turkey. There are also species of the Machairodontini found in Africa from the late Miocene to the early Pleistocene, in deposits such as Lothagam, Sahabi, and Langebaanweg. The Machairodontini moved East during the Vallesian (11.6-0.9 million years ago), when they entered Asia about 10 million years ago and became one of the major predators of this time.

There were once also similarities between species found in North America and Eurasia that support an immigration event from Eurasia which took place before the late Miocene, at about the end of the early Hemphillian (~5 million years ago). The Old World (Europe/Africa/Asia) species Machairodus aphanistus and the New World (North and South America) species Machairodus catocopis (now know to belong to the genus Nimravides) were once though to have been very closely related, suggesting that there was a migration and that these saber-toothed cats did radiate from Eurasia into North America. This made sense based on evolutionary similarities between North American and Eurasian species as well as the immigration of other species between these two continents at this time in Earth's history. However, this was disproven with discoveries that the Homotherini were not descended from the Machairodontini and that several species of Machairodontine, such as Nimravides catacopsis, Homotherium and Amphimachairodus were revealed to be Homotherines.

Evolutionary Relationships
Previous analysis of the saber-toothed cats used Linnaean classification based the morphology of the upper canines, which suggested that there were four tribes within the subfamily of Machairodontinae. These tribes include Machairodontini, Homotherini, Smildontini, and Matailurini seen in the cladogram of Machairodontinae. Then upon finding further fossils, Machairodontini was assigned to the Homotherini tribe. The Homotherini includes species such as Machairodus, (M. aphanistus and M. giganteus). These species are characterized by their scimitar teeth that make up the large upper canines. The Smildontini tribe includes species such as Paramachairodus, Megantereon, and Smilodon. These species have been characterized based on their longer, dagger-like teeth. The other tribe Matailurini includes species such as Matailurus and Dinofelis. These have been classified by having teeth different than the previous two clades, the long serrated teeth and the long, dagger-like teeth. Unfortunately, there are few postcranial skeletons of saber-toothed cats preserved, so available phylogenetic characters are largely cranial.

New research published in 2013 took a different approach to elucidating the evolutionary relationships of saber-toothed cats. This approach used cladistic phylogeny instead of the previous Linnaean classification. The results concluded the original four tribes could not be recovered by parsimony analysis because many of the synapomorphies of the saber toothed cats are based on other bones that the prominent, upper canines.

Workers now recognize a clade for true saber toothed cats called Eumachairodontia that includes species from all of the previously proposed tribes: Megantereon, Smilodon, Amphimachairodus, Homotherium and Xenosmilus. The synapomorphy for the "true saber-toothed" clade Eumachairodontia is the hypertrophied, greatly flattened upper canines. The true machairodontines have a synapomorphy of flattened, small, lower canines and other bone variations such as the small upper first molar compared to basal, pre-saber toothed cats large, transversely situated upper first molar and large upper third premolar parastyle.

Morphology and Behavior
The enlarged canines of these species were not only a unique morphological trait but also were used as a specialized hunting tool. It is proposed that the effective use of the specialized canines is the canine shear-bite. This is a model that shows how the teeth would bite the prey's neck or other convex area of the body, and use the upper jaw as an anchor to pull the teeth down through the skin and create large puncture wounds for blood loss and possibly tear a significant flesh wound. The shearing bite as mentioned above would cause less tooth breakage when used in fast pursuit.

Some species within the Machairodontini show strong sexual dimorphism, such as M. aphanistus, but other machairodonts, such as the smilodontin Paramachairodus, display very slight sexual dimorphism. The canines of the males seem to be larger than the female canines. This could be due to mate competition for females. The varied dimorphism does suggest that different species had different forms of lifestyles as how today's modern cats live.

See also
 Big cat

References

Machairodontinae
Mammal tribes
Miocene carnivorans
Pliocene carnivorans
Pleistocene carnivorans
Miocene first appearances
Pleistocene extinctions